Carex morrowii, the kan suge, Morrow's sedge, Japanese grass sedge or Japanese sedge (a name it shares with Carex oshimensis), is a species of flowering plant in the family Cyperaceae. It is native to central and southern Japan, and has been introduced to Belgium, Denmark and Austria. 

An ornamental sedge with a large number of (mostly variegated) cultivars, it tolerates heavy shade and wet soil, and is erosion and deer-resistant. Consequently it is recommended as a slowly spreading ground cover, for naturalizing, and in rain gardens. It is hardy in USDA zones 5 through 9 and does well in containers.

Subtaxa
The following varieties are currently accepted:
Carex morrowii var. laxa  – Yakushima
Carex morrowii var. morrowii
Carex morrowii var. temnolepis  – Japan

Cultivars
A large number of cultivars are commercially available, including:
'Everglow'
'Fisher's Form'
'Gilt'
'Gold Band'
'Ice Dance'
'Irish Green'
'Nana Variegata'
'Pinkie'
'Silk Tassel'
'Vanilla Ice'
'Variegata'

Notes

References

morrowii
Ornamental plants
Endemic flora of Japan
Plants described in 1857